Craspedochiton is a genus of chitons in the family Acanthochitonidae, endemic to New Zealand, the Philippines and Australia.

Species
 Craspedochiton aberrans (Odhner, 1919)
 Craspedochiton cornutus (Torr & Ashby, 1898)
 Craspedochiton elegans (Iredale)
 Craspedochiton foresti (Leloup, 1965)
 Craspedochiton hystricosus Kaas, 1991
 Craspedochiton isipingoensis (Sykes, 1901)
 Craspedochiton laqueatus (Sowerby, 1841)
 Craspedochiton liberiensis Thiele, 1909
 Craspedochiton petasa (Reeve, 1847)
 Craspedochiton producta (Carpenter in Pilsbry, 1892)
 Craspedochiton pyramidalis (Is. Taki, 1938)
 Craspedochiton tesselatus Nierstrasz, 1905

Synonyms:
 Craspedochiton hemphilli (Pilsbry, 1893): Synonym of Acanthochitona hemphilli (Pilsbry, 1893)
 Craspedochiton rubiginosus (Hutton, 1872): Synonym of Notoplax rubiginosa (Hutton, 1872)
 Craspedochiton rubiginosus oliveri (Ashby, 1926)
 Craspedochiton rubiginosus rubiginosus (Hutton, 1872)
 Craspedochiton tetricus (Carpenter in Dall, 1882): Synonym of Craspedochiton laqueatus (Sowerby, 1841)
 Craspedochiton variabilis (H. Adams & Angas, 1864): Synonym of Craspedoplax variabilis (H. Adams & Angas, 1864)

References

 OBIS
 
 Powell A. W. B., New Zealand Mollusca, William Collins Publishers Ltd, Auckland, New Zealand 1979 

Acanthochitonidae
Extant Miocene first appearances